The ASM-N-2 Bat was a United States Navy World War II radar-guided glide bomb which was used in combat beginning in April 1944. It was developed and overseen by a unit within the National Bureau of Standards (which unit later became a part of the Army Research Laboratory) with assistance from the Navy's Bureau of Ordnance, the Massachusetts Institute of Technology, and Bell Telephone Laboratories. It is considered to be the first fully automated guided missile used in combat.

Background
In January 1941 RCA proposed a new TV-guided anti-shipping weapon, called Dragon, for which an operator would use the TV image sent from the nose of the weapon and operate aerodynamic controls during the weapon's fall. The National Bureau of Standards (NBS) would provide the airframe for use with a standard bomb, and was the same guidable ordnance airframe design used for the earlier, abortive Project Pigeon weapons program. The Pelican was a June 1942 modification using semi-active radar homing. This Pelican version entered testing in summer 1944 at Naval Air Station New York, where it hit its target ship in two out of four drops.

Development
The Bat was the production version which combined the original NBS airframe with a  AN-M65 GP bomb, the same basic ordnance that was used in the contemporary Azon guided munition, and the Pelican active radar system. Gyrostabilized with an autopilot supplied by Bendix Aviation, the steerable tail elevator was powered by small wind-driven generators. The Navy's Bureau of Ordnance in partnership with the Massachusetts Institute of Technology (MIT) supervised development and the NBS was in charge of the overall development. Flight tests were conducted at the Naval Air Ordnance Test Station at Chincoteague Island, Virginia. Hugh Latimer Dryden won the President's Certificate of Merit for the development of the Bat, which "was flight tested by a small unit based at Philadelphia against targets in New Jersey." While the NBS developed the Bat's aerodynamic and gyroscopic stabilizing systems, MIT and Bell Labs worked together on its guidance mechanism.

Deployment

Several Bats were also fitted with modified radar systems (SWOD Mark 9 Model 1) and dropped on Japanese-held bridges in Burma – the same targets that the MCLOS-guidance, half-ton (AN-M65 GP bomb) weight VB-1 Azon PGM ordnance was designed to take on – and other land-based targets. The Bat's pioneering radar guidance system was easily confused by radar land clutter, particularly against targets close to shore. About a total of 2,600 Bat missiles were deployed.

After the war, the naval designation ASM-N-2 was applied to the unit.

The Privateer was the primary launch platform for the Bat, but other aircraft were also modified to launch the weapon, including the Vought F4U Corsair, Curtiss SB2C Helldiver, and Grumman TBF Avenger. The primary post-World War II aircraft to carry the weapon was the P-2 Neptune.

Existing missiles
The original NBS test airframe of the Bat was renovated in 2001 to resemble the real missile and is currently on display at the museum of the National Institute of Standards and Technology, the successor to the earlier US National Bureau of Standards.

See also

References

External links

Andreas Parsch's "Directory of US Military Rockets & Missiles" entry on the Bat
Family Tree & History of the ASM-N-2 BAT Glide Bomb

World War II aerial bombs of the United States
Anti-ship missiles of the United States
World War II guided missiles of the United States
Guided bombs of the United States
Weapons and ammunition introduced in 1945